Warin (died 9 September 984) was the Archbishop of Cologne, Germany, from 976 to 984.

Life
Warin's origins are not recorded. He became a cleric of the Cathedral in Cologne.

Warin became the Archbishop of Cologne in 976. In 983 the Holy Roman Emperor Otto II entrusted Warin with the education of his son and heir Otto. He crowned Otto as king of Germany in Aachen on Christmas Day of that year. However, after Otto II's death in 984, he handed Otto III to Henry the Saint and supported the latter's overtures to the German throne. 

Warin died in 984 and was buried in the Abbey of St. Martin.

See also

 Minnborinus of Cologne

References

10th-century births

984 deaths
Year of birth unknown
Archbishops of Cologne

10th-century archbishops